The 1906 Calgary municipal election was held on December 10, 1906 to elect a Mayor and twelve Aldermen to sit on the twenty-third Calgary City Council from January 14, 1907 to January 2, 1908.

Arthur Leslie Cameron was elected Mayor of Calgary for the second time, his first occurring in the 1897 Calgary municipal election.

Background
The election was held under multiple non-transferable vote where each elector was able to cast a ballot for the mayor and up to three ballots for separate councillors with a voter's designated ward.

The requirements for a candidate to be eligible to run for the office of Mayor or Aldermen included being a male or female over the age of 21. Property ownership requirements included owning real property with an assessed value of $200, or tenants of real property with a value of $400, or income in the amount of $400.

All Aldermen candidates for Ward 3 and Ward 4 were acclaimed upon the close of nomination on December 3, 1906.

Richard Addison Brocklebank was convinced to run as a candidate for Mayor in November prior to the election, he did so with the backing of Labour on the condition he would run as an independent. In order to be eligible as a candidate for the Mayoral election, Brocklebank resigned from the License Commission a day prior to the election.

Results

Mayor

Councillors

Ward 1

Ward 2

Ward 3

Ward 4

Public School Board Trustees

Separate School Board Trustees
J.J. Chamberlain
J.R. Miquelon

See also
List of Calgary municipal elections

References

Municipal elections in Calgary
1906 elections in Canada
1900s in Calgary